Diorini is a tribe of beetles in the subfamily Cerambycinae, containing the single genus Diorus and the single species Diorus biapiculatus.

References

Cerambycinae
Monotypic Cerambycidae genera